John Acland may refer to:

Politicians
Sir John Acland (died 1620) (c. 1552–1620), English MP for Devon 1607–1614
John Acland (Callington MP) (c. 1674–1703), English MP for Callington 1702–1703
John Acland (runholder) (1823–1904), New Zealand politician and runholder
John Dyke Acland (1746–1778), British Army officer and MP for Callington 1774–1778
John Palmer-Acland (1756–1831), born John Acland, British MP for Bridgwater

Others
Sir John Acland, 1st Baronet (c. 1591–1647), English royalist
Sir John Acland, 3rd Baronet (c. 1636–1655), English baronet
John Acland (author) (c. 1729–1795), English author
Sir John Dyke Acland, 8th Baronet (1778–1785), British baronet
John Acland (British Army officer) (1928–2006), British major-general
Sir John Dyke Acland, 16th Baronet (1939–2009), British baronet
John Acland (died 1553) of Acland, Landkey, Devon

See also
Acland (surname)
Acland baronets